Magnificent Team is a 1998 Hong Kong action crime comedy film directed by David Lam and starring Francis Ng, Christine Ng, Amanda Lee, Simon Lui, Benz Hui, Karen Tong and the-then newcomer Herman Chan in his only film role.

Cast
Francis Ng as Chick
Christine Ng as Kitty
Amanda Lee as Madam Zita Fong
Simon Lui as Chiu
Benz Hui as Sergeant Hui
Karen Tong as Mimi
Herman Chan as Wing
Angela Tong as Yuki
Michael Lam as Two Stroke
Yee Tin-hung as TNT
Lo Mang as Boss King
William Duen as John
Woo Wai-chung as Hung / Dam U
Chin Hoi Lun as Sandy
Orlando To as Sandy's brother
Conroy Chan as David Lin
Chan Chi-hung as Officer Chan
Chu Cho-kuen as Salty
Stephen Ho as Inspector
Michael Lam Kong as John's subordinate
Emily Kwan as Zita's former CIB colleague
Nelson Cheung as Zita's former CIB colleague
Ling Chi-hung as Armour guard / CID
Chan Siu-wah as CID
Law Wai-kai as Care-taker
Tang Wing-san as Zita's father
Pang Mei-seung as Chick's mother

External links

Magnificent Team at Hong Kong Cinemagic

Magnificent Team Review at LoveHKFilm.com

1998 films
1998 action comedy films
1990s crime comedy films
Hong Kong action comedy films
Hong Kong crime comedy films
Police detective films
1990s Cantonese-language films
Films set in Hong Kong
Films shot in Hong Kong
1990s Hong Kong films